Hampton School District may refer to:

 Hampton School District (Arkansas), in Hampton, Arkansas
 Hampton School District (Connecticut), in Hampton, Connecticut
 Hampton School District (New Hampshire), in Hampton, New Hampshire
 Hampton School District (New Jersey) in Hampton, New Jersey
 Hampton City Public Schools in Hampton, Virginia
 Hampton Bays Public Schools in Hampton Bays, New York

See also 
 Hampton Township School District (disambiguation)